|}

The Prix de la Forêt is a Group 1 flat horse race in France open to thoroughbreds aged three years or older. It is run at Longchamp over a distance of 1,400 metres (about 7 furlongs), and it is scheduled to take place each year in early October.

History
The event was originally held at Chantilly, and it is named after Chantilly Forest. It was established in 1858, and was initially a 2,100-metre race for two or three-year-old colts and fillies. It took place in late October.

The Prix de la Forêt was not run in 1870, because of the Franco-Prussian War. It was cut to 1,600 metres and opened to older horses in 1878. It was cancelled again in 1906, and transferred to Longchamp in 1907.

The race was abandoned throughout World War I, with no running from 1914 to 1918. It was shortened to 1,400 metres in 1923. It was cancelled once during World War II, in 1939. It was staged at Auteuil in 1940, and Le Tremblay in 1943 and 1944.

The event was closed to two-year-olds in 1995, and opened to geldings in 2001. It was moved to the Saturday of Prix de l'Arc de Triomphe weekend in 2005. It was switched to the same day as the "Arc", the first Sunday in October, in 2010.

The Prix de la Forêt was added to the Breeders' Cup Challenge series in 2012. The winner now earns an automatic invitation to compete in the same year's Breeders' Cup Mile.

Records
Most successful horse (3 wins):
 One Master – 2018, 2019, 2020

Leading jockey (5 wins):
 Alfred Carratt – Normandie (1866), Mathilde (1871), Premier Mai (1874), Phenix (1878), Barberine (1885)
 Alain Lequeux – Mirna (1963), Sanedtki (1977, 1978), Producer (1979), Procida (1984)
 Freddy Head – Barbare (1966), Regent Street (1968), Lyphard (1972), Ma Biche (1983), Septieme Ciel (1990)
 Olivier Peslier - Bigstone (1994), Poplar Bluff (1995), Etoile Montante (2003), Goldikova (2010), Make Believe (2015)

Leading trainer (8 wins):
 Henry Jennings – Wedding (1859), Finlande (1860), Normandie (1866), Mathilde (1871), Christiania (1872), Barcarolle (1873), Premier Mai (1874), Peronne (1881)

Leading owner (9 wins):
 Marcel Boussac – Durzetta (1920), Zariba (1921), La Moqueuse (1928), Esmeralda (1941), Caravelle (1943, 1944), Goyama (1945), Pharsale (1950), Pharaos (1951)

Winners since 1970

Earlier winners

 1858: Union Jack
 1859: Wedding
 1860: Finlande
 1861: Bravoure
 1862:
 1863: Eva
 1864: Tourmalet
 1865: Salambo
 1866: Normandie
 1867: Nemea
 1868: Pompier
 1869: Monseigneur
 1870: no race
 1871: Mathilde
 1872: Christiania
 1873: Barcarolle
 1874: Premier Mai
 1875: Bibletto
 1876: Kilt
 1877: Astree
 1878: Phenix
 1879: Seymour
 1880: Castillon
 1881: Peronne
 1882: Veston
 1883: Azur
 1884: Azur
 1885: Barberine
 1886: Fricandeau
 1887: Acheron
 1888: Catharina
 1889: Alicante
 1890: Chalet
 1891: Le Nord
 1892: Fra Angelico
 1893: Dolma Baghtche
 1894: Omnium II
 1895: Hero
 1896: Castelnau
 1897: Royal Mint
 1898: Herse
 1899: Semendria
 1900: La Camargo
 1901: Limousin
 1902: Mireille
 1903: Lorlot
 1904: Adam
 1905: Prestige
 1906: no race
 1907: Valda
 1908: Princess Margaret
 1909: Moulins la Marche
 1910: Ronde de Nuit
 1911: Montrose / Petulance 
 1912: Blarney
 1913: Le Grand Pressigny
 1914–18: no race
 1919: Cid Campeador
 1920: Durzetta
 1921: Zariba
 1922: Épinard
 1923: Scaramouche
 1924: Niceas
 1925: Brumaire
 1926: Licteur
 1927: Coram
 1928: La Moqueuse
 1929: Chateau Bouscaut
 1930: Baoule
 1931: Four in Hand
 1932: Assuerus / Lovelace 
 1933: Jocrisse
 1934: Jus de Raisin
 1935: Gong
 1936: Mousson
 1937: Blue Star
 1938: Dixiana
 1939: no race
 1940: Corviglia
 1941: Esmeralda
 1942: Buena Vista
 1943: Caravelle
 1944: Caravelle
 1945: Goyama
 1946: Vagabond
 1947: Menetrier
 1948: Fontenay
 1949: Tantieme
 1950: Pharsale
 1951: Pharaos
 1952: Guersant
 1953: Fine Top
 1954: Fine Top
 1955: Vareta
 1956: Midget
 1957: Oferista
 1958: Currito
 1959: Hautain
 1960: Mincio
 1961: Snob
 1962: Spy Well
 1963: Mirna
 1964: Kirkland Lake
 1965: Red Slipper
 1966: Barbare
 1967: Cabhurst
 1968: Regent Street
 1969: Democratie

See also
 List of French flat horse races

References

 France Galop (1979–1989) / Racing Post (1990–present) :
 galop.courses-france.com:
 1858–1859, 1860–1889, 1890–1919, 1920–1949, 1950–1979, 1980–2009
 france-galop.com – A Brief History: Prix de la Forêt.
 galopp-sieger.de – Prix de la Forêt.
 horseracingintfed.com – International Federation of Horseracing Authorities – Prix de la Forêt (2018).
 pedigreequery.com – Prix de la Forêt – Longchamp.

Open mile category horse races
Longchamp Racecourse
Horse races in France
Breeders' Cup Challenge series
Recurring sporting events established in 1858
1858 establishments in France